"" is a patriotic German song written by Ludwig Bauer (1832–1910) in 1859 and set to music by Henry Hugh Pierson. The song was, besides the "Deutschlandlied", "Die Wacht am Rhein" and "Des Deutschen Vaterland", the most popular patriotic anthem in the 19th century.

History 
In 1858, Henry Hugh Pierson, an English composer resident in Germany, had written a tune for the patriotic song "Ye Mariners of England" by Thomas Campbell. One year later, he met Ludwig Bauer, who later married Pierson's stepdaughter Dorothea Lyser. Pierson asked Bauer to write a German text to the existing tune.

Lyrics

References

External links
 
 

German patriotic songs
1859 songs
Songs about Germany